The Crockett Tavern Museum is a history museum in Morristown, Tennessee, that commemorates the American folk hero David "Davy" Crockett. The museum was started in 1955, when a popular craze over the legacy of Davy Crockett was at its peak, and opened in 1958. It was listed on the National Register of Historic Places in December 2013.

The museum's main building is a log cabin structure built in the 1950s as a representation of the tavern that Davy Crockett's father, John Crockett, established in 1794 at the approximate location of the modern museum.

The museum is operated by the Hamblen County chapter of the Association for the Preservation of Tennessee Antiquities.

References

External links

Buildings and structures on the National Register of Historic Places in Tennessee
Museums in Hamblen County, Tennessee
Crockett, Davy
Davy Crockett
Museums established in 1955
1955 establishments in Tennessee
National Register of Historic Places in Hamblen County, Tennessee
Museums on the National Register of Historic Places
Buildings and structures in Hamblen County, Tennessee
Morristown, Tennessee
Tourist attractions in Hamblen County, Tennessee